Knabrostræde 21 is a Neoclassical property in the Old Town of Copenhagen, Denmark. The building is one of the many residential buildings constructed by the industrious master builder Johan Martin Quist in the years after the Copenhagen Fire of 1795. It was listed on the Danish registry of protected buildings and places in 1945 and unlisted in 2019.

History

18th century

The property was in Copenhagen's first cadastre of 1689 listed as No. 79. It was at that time owned by tailor  Lars Eriksen. It was listed as No. 73 and was then owned by the widow of Arent Johansen Krej.

The property was destroyed in the Copenhagen Fire of 1795, together with most of the other buildings in the area. The fire sites No. 73 and the adjacent corner property at No. 49 (now Knabrostræde 19) were after the fire acquired by the master builder Johan Martin Quist (1755-1818). A small section of No. 40 was in this connection transferred to the old No. 73. The current building on the site was constructed by Quist in 1797–98.

19th century

No. 49B is for some reason missing in the census records from 1801. The property was listed as No. 113 in the new cadastre of 1806. It was at that time owned by a regiment quarter master named Møller.

At the time of the 1840 census, No. 113 was home to a total of 31 people. They included royal customs officer Jacob Lorentz Prom	 (born 1780), master shoemaker Ludvig Christian Prom (born 1814), book printer Marie Irgens (born 1769), coachman (kgl. kavalerkysk) Niels Christian Grækersen (born 1800) and worker Peter Jensen Osberg (born 1794) with their respective households. Eith the introduction of house numbering in Copenhagen, in 1859, Snaren's Quarter No. 113 became Knabrostræde 21.

Architecture
The building consists of four storeys over a raised cellar and is seven bays wide. The centrally placed main entrance is topped by a transom window. The roof features five dormer windows towards the street. Two perpendicular side wings extend from the rear side of the building.

Today
The building has been divided into condominiums.

References

External links

 Frederikssund Apotek
 C. Liebenberg

Listed residential buildings in Copenhagen
Johan Martin Quist buildings
Residential buildings completed in 1798
1798 establishments in Denmark